Niko Laakkonen (born June 15, 1988) is a Finnish former professional ice hockey winger.

Laakkonen began his career with KalPa's Jr. teams between 2003 and 2009. Unable to make it to KalPa's main roster, he signed for SaPKo in Mestis. After four seasons, Laakkonen joined Jukurit in 2013. Jukurit were promoted to Liiga for the 2016–17 season to replace Blues who folded due to bankruptcy. Laakkonen played 34 games in Liiga for Jukurit, but failed to score and single goal and managed just three assists. It turned out to be his last professional season.

References

External links

1988 births
Living people
Finnish ice hockey forwards
Iisalmen Peli-Karhut players
Mikkelin Jukurit players
People from Varkaus
SaPKo players
Sportspeople from North Savo